Route 134 is a short highway in the Lake of the Ozarks area of Missouri.  Its southern terminus is in Lake of the Ozarks State Park; its northern terminus is at Route 42 near Osage Beach.

Major intersections

References

134
Transportation in Camden County, Missouri
Transportation in Miller County, Missouri